Maashaven is an above-ground metro station in the south of the city of Rotterdam. It is part of Rotterdam Metro lines D and E.

The station opened on 9 February 1968, the same date that the North-South Line (also formerly called Erasmus line), of which it is a part, was opened. Maashaven station is located just east of a harbor with the same name. Maas is the name of the Dutch (and also German) part of the Meuse river, while haven is the Dutch word for harbor.

Located underneath the station is a Rotterdam tram stop, where travelers can get on RET-operated tram line 2.

Rotterdam Metro stations
RandstadRail stations in Rotterdam
Railway stations opened in 1968
1968 establishments in the Netherlands
Railway stations in the Netherlands opened in the 20th century
Railway stations in the Netherlands opened in the 1960s